Moisés Isaac Caicedo Corozo (born 2 November 2001) is an Ecuadorian professional footballer who plays as a midfielder for Premier League club Brighton & Hove Albion  and the Ecuador national team.

Professional career

Independiente del Valle
Caicedo joined the youth academy of Independiente del Valle at the age of 13, and joined their first team in 2019. Caicedo debuted for Independiente del Valle in a 1–0 Ecuadorian Serie A win over L.D.U. Quito on 1 October 2019.

Brighton & Hove Albion
On 1 February 2021, Caicedo joined English side Brighton & Hove Albion on a four and a half year deal, for an undisclosed fee.
On 10 February 2021, Caicedo made his first appearance in Brighton’s first-team matchday squad in Brighton’s 1–0 away loss against Leicester City in the FA Cup, where he was an unused substitute.

He made his debut for Brighton on 24 August starting in the EFL Cup second round away fixture at Cardiff City where he set up Andi Zeqiri’s first Albion goal in the 2–0 win.

Beerschot (loan)
On transfer deadline day of 31 August 2021, Caicedo joined Beerschot of the Belgium top flight on a season-long loan. He scored his first goal on his seventh appearance, a 90+2 minute strike to seal all three points in the 2–0 home win over Genk. On 12 January 2022, due to shortages of central midfielders at Brighton, Caicedo was recalled from his loan and returned to England.

Return to Brighton

Immediately on his return to Sussex, he was included on the bench where he remained for the 1–1 home draw against bitter rivals Crystal Palace on 15 January. He made his first appearance since returning and second overall for the Albion coming on as a substitute in the 3–1 away loss at Tottenham Hotspur in the FA Cup fourth round on 5 February. Caicedo made his Premier League debut on 9 April, starting and assisting Enock Mwepu's goal in the 2–1 away win over Arsenal. He scored his first goal for the Albion on 7 May, opening the scoreline in a 4–0 win over Manchester United, with a 15th minute low 25-yard strike.

Caicedo opened his goal account for the 2022–23 season in his and Brighton's sixth match of the season on 4 September, a 5–2 home win over Leicester City. During January 2023, Caicedo signed a new deal with a football agency company, and on 27 January, with interest coming in from league leaders Arsenal, his agents released a statement announcing he wanted to leave Brighton in an open letter on the players Instagram page. Stating that, "I am the youngest of 10 siblings from a poor upbringing in Santa Domingo in Ecuador. My dream always to be the most decorated player in the history of Ecuador," thanking Albion fans saying they "will always be in my heart."
However, Brighton refused to sell the Ecuadorian with the 21-year-old in contract with the Sussex club until the summer of 2025, after telling him to rest until the end of the transfer window. He returned to training on 1 February and returned to action on the 4th, coming on as a substitute in the 1–0 home win over Bournemouth with Roberto De Zerbi telling fans not to criticise the player. On 3 March 2023, Caicedo signed a new long term contract with Brighton until 2027, with the option of an additional years extension.

International career
Caicedo debuted for the senior Ecuador national team in a 1–0 2022 FIFA World Cup qualifying loss to Argentina on 9 October 2020. He scored the opening goal in a 4–2 home win over Uruguay on 13 October 2020 at the Estadio Rodrigo Paz Delgado, becoming the first player born in the 21st century to ever score in CONMEBOL World Cup qualifying.

On 14 November, Caicedo was named in Ecuador's 26-man squad for the 2022 FIFA World Cup alongside Brighton teammates Pervis Estupiñán and Jeremy Sarmiento. In the last group match tie against Senegal on 29 November, Caicedo scored the equaliser that would've seen Ecuador through to the round of 16. However, Kalidou Koulibaly scored for Senegal three minutes later to regain the lead and send the Africans through instead.

Career statistics

Club

International

Scores and results list Ecuador's goal tally first, score column indicates score after each Caicedo goal.

Honours
Independiente Juniors
U-20 Copa Libertadores: 2020

References

External links

 
 

2001 births
Living people
People from Santo Domingo de Los Tsáchilas Province
Ecuadorian footballers
Association football midfielders
C.S.D. Independiente del Valle footballers
Brighton & Hove Albion F.C. players
K Beerschot VA players
Ecuadorian Serie A players
Belgian Pro League players
Premier League players
Ecuador international footballers
2021 Copa América players
2022 FIFA World Cup players
Ecuadorian expatriate footballers
Expatriate footballers in Belgium
Expatriate footballers in England
Ecuadorian expatriate sportspeople in Belgium
Ecuadorian expatriate sportspeople in England